The UCI Track Cycling World Cup (formerly known as the UCI Track Cycling World Cup Classics) was a multi race tournament held over a track cycling season - usually between October and February. Each series is divided into several rounds, each held in a different country. It was replaced in 2021 by the UCI Track Cycling Nations Cup.

Format 

The UCI Track Cycling World Cup is a key event within the Track Cycling calendar, with only the World Championships and the Olympic Games attracting more World Ranking points.

The series is open to national teams and registered trade teams who compete over a number of track cycling disciplines. The overall classification is decided on a points system with riders or teams amassing points in each discipline competed during each round of the series. The rider or team that has the greatest number of points in each discipline wears a white jersey in that discipline in the following round to denote their status as leader. The World Cup trophy is presented to the nation with the greatest number of points in each discipline at the end of the final round of the series.

The inaugural round of the UCI Track Cycling World Cup Classics (as it was then known) was held in Copenhagen, Denmark in May 1993. The series is held over a track cycling season which was initially between February and June of each year; however since 2004–05 this has changed to between October and February. The number of rounds within each series has varied each year but has generally been between 3 and 6 rounds.

The name UCI Track Cycling World Cup was adopted from the 2011–12 series.

Hosts

History 

A summary of the World Cup trophy winning nations by year is shown below:

See also 
 UCI Track Cycling Nations Cup

References

External links 

 
tissot timing.com

 
UCI World Cups
Track cycling races